The D&K Lafferty Cup Tournament, commonly known as the 'Oban Tournament', is a pre-season football tournament held by Oban Saints AFC in Oban, Argyll and Bute, Scotland. The tournament is played in a round-robin format of matches lasting 30 minutes and regularly attracts Scottish league clubs, with SPFL teams (previously SPL) Heart of Midlothian and Dundee United, and (previously SFL) Hamilton Academical and St Johnstone participating in 2008.  The tournament was in its fifteenth year as of 2008, with the majority of teams from the previous year returning to compete again.

Previous winners include:
 1999: Clyde
 2000: Clyde
 2001: Clyde
 2002: Heart of Midlothian
 2003: Nairn County
 2004: Dundee United
 2005: Dumbarton
 2006: Heart of Midlothian
 2007: Alloa Athletic
 2008: Dundee United
 2009: Alloa Athletic
 2010: Dundee United
 2011: Alloa Athletic
 2012: Heart of Midlothian
 2013: Hamilton Academical
 2014: Hamilton Academical
 2015: Heart of Midlothian
 2016: Hamilton Academical
 2017: Hamilton Academical
 2018: Dundee United
 2019: Hamilton Academical

References

External links
 2008 tournament
 2007 tournament
 2006 tournament
 2005 tournament
 2004 tournament
 2003 tournament

Football in Argyll and Bute
Scottish football friendly trophies
Football cup competitions in Scotland